Noisy-le-Grand is a commune in the eastern suburbs of Paris, France. The commune of Noisy-le-Grand is part of the sector of Porte de Paris, one of the four sectors of the "new town" of Marne-la-Vallée.

Some of the postmodern architecture in the commune has been used as a shooting location in movies including Brazil and The Hunger Games.

Name
The name Noisy comes from Medieval Latin nucetum, meaning "walnut grove", after the walnut trees covering the territory of Noisy-le-Grand in ancient times.

The epithet "le-Grand" (Medieval Latin: Magnum), meaning "the Great", was added in the Middle Ages, probably to distinguish Noisy-le-Grand from the smaller settlement of Noisy-le-Sec, which was sometimes referred to as Nucenum Minus ("Noisy the Small").

Demographics

Like a lot of other Seine-Saint-Denis cities, the commune is very cosmopolitan, home of many communities, with a lot of its locals coming from various continents and countries. It has a large African population, mostly from sub-Saharan countries (Senegal, Mali, Ivory Coast and many others) and East Asian countries, such as China, Vietnam and Cambodia. The city also includes significant, but less numerous, communities from Portugal and North African countries like Morocco and Algeria. Recently, the department, and the Parisian suburbs in general, has seen a new wave of immigration coming from Eastern Europe. Noisy-le-Grand now has communities from former Eastern Bloc countries like Romania, Bulgaria and Russia.

As of 1998 there were 2,700 East Asians in Noisy le Grand, making up about 5-6% of the city; many of them lived in the same complexes occupied by Africans and other foreigners, and Asians were widely distributed around the commune.

Administration
The canton of Noisy-le-Grand comprises two communes: Noisy-le-Grand and Gournay-sur-Marne.

Economy
Previously Star Airlines (now XL Airways France) had its headquarters in the Immeuble Horizon building in the commune. Cédric Pastrour, the founder of the airline, said that the company chose the Noisy site because the airline did not yet know which airport, Charles de Gaulle Airport or Orly Airport, would serve as the airline's base, and that the Noisy site was equidistant to both airports. Pastour added that the Noisy site had access to the A4 and the A86 autoroutes and was close to the Francilienne, and that the costs in the Noisy area were lower than the costs in the airport area.

Education
The commune has municipal preschools and elementary schools.

Junior high schools:
 Collège du Clos Saint-Vincent
 Collège François-Mitterrand
 Collège Françoise-Cabrini
 Collège international
 Collège Jacques-Prévert
 Collège Saint-Exupéry
 Collège Victor-Hugo

Senior high schools/sixth form colleges:
Lycée Évariste-Galois (Noisy-le-Grand)
Lycée Flora-Tristan (Noisy-le-Grand)
Lycée Françoise-Cabrini (Noisy-le-Grand)
Lycée International de l'Est Parisien  (Noisy-le-Grand)

Transport
Noisy-le-Grand is served by two stations on Paris RER line A: Noisy-le-Grand–Mont d'Est station and Noisy–Champs station.

Noisy-le-Grand is also served by Les Yvris–Noisy-le-Grand station on Paris RER line E.

Heraldry

Notable people
 Alexis Claude-Maurice, footballer
 Steve Hérélius, boxer
 Steven Moreira, footballer
 Johan Passave-Ducteil, basketball player
 Théophile Poilpot, painter
 Wesley Said, footballer
 Jean-Marc Théolleyre, (1924–2001), French journalist, winner of the 1959 Prix Albert Londres, died in Noisy-le-Grand

See also

Communes of the Seine-Saint-Denis department
Zodiac balloon accident

References

External links

 Official website

Communes of Seine-Saint-Denis
Porte de Paris